Awiakay, also known as Karamba or Kansomai, is a little-known Arafundi language of New Guinea.

References

Arafundi languages
Languages of East Sepik Province